Şıxhapıt (also, Şıxhaput, Shykh-Gaput, and Shykhgapyt) is a village in the Khachmaz Rayon of Azerbaijan.  The village forms part of the municipality of Qaraçaycek.

References 

Populated places in Khachmaz District